The Lying Life of Adults is a 2019 novel by Elena Ferrante. It was adapted into a television series of the same name by Edoardo De Angelis in 2023.

Synopsis
In Naples in the early 1990s, twelve-year-old Giovanna Trada overhears her father Andrea disparagingly liken her appearance to that of his estranged sister Vittoria. This sends Giovanna into a search for Vittoria on another side of Naples to discover the nature of the family's fallout.

Publication
The novel was first published in Italy in November 2019 by Edizioni e/o, published as part of their Dal Mondo series. An English translation by Ann Goldstein was scheduled to be published by Europa Editions on 9 June 2020, but was postponed to 1 September 2020 due to the COVID-19 pandemic. The English translation debuted at number two on The New York Times fiction best-seller list.

Reception
In its starred review, Kirkus Reviews praised Goldstein's "fluid" translation and wrote, "Giovanna's nascent sexuality is more frankly explored than that of previous Ferrante protagonists".

Publishers Weekly called Giovanna a "winning character" but nonetheless wrote that the novel "feels minor in comparison to Ferrante's previous work".

A review in The New York Times stated that the book "evokes for me all the ordinary, warring paradoxes of intimate life."

Television adaptation

In May 2020, Netflix announced it would be adapting The Lying Life of Adults into a television series of the same name in collaboration with Italy's Fandango production company. The series was released by Netflix in January 2023.

References

2019 novels
21st-century Italian novels
Novels by Elena Ferrante
Novels set in Naples
Novels set in the 1990s
Works postponed due to the COVID-19 pandemic
Italian novels adapted into television shows
Edizioni E/O books